Sir Michael Anthony Latham DL HonFREng (20 November 1942 – 2 November 2017) was a British Conservative Member of Parliament.

Political career
Latham was elected to the Churchill Ward on Westminster City Council in 1968. He did not stand at the subsequent election in 1971, but became the Conservative MP for Melton in February 1974. In 1983, following boundary changes, was elected to represent Rutland and Melton, before standing down in 1992.

After Parliament
In 1994, he wrote the influential joint government and industry report on the UK construction industry,  'Constructing the Team' (known as the Latham Report).  In it he advocated partnerships within the fragmented and highly contentious construction industry.  More significantly, he made many recommendations as to how conflict could be minimised within the industry.  Such was the nature and extent of these recommendations that Mr Justice Jackson later described the report as "the whirlwind which hit the construction industry".

In 1997, he was elected as a Honorary Fellow of the Royal Academy of Engineering.

After standing down from parliament he has held numerous positions in the construction industry including chairman of the Construction Industry Training Board (2002–10), chairman of ConstructionSkills (2003–10), chairman, then deputy chairman of Willmott Dixon Limited (1999–2002, 2002–09), chairman of Collaborative Working Centre Limited (since 2003) and deputy chairman of BIW Technologies (2000–05).

Latham was knighted in the 1993 New Year Honours for political service. He was also an FRSA, FCGI, Hon. RICS, Hon. FRIBA, Hon. FCIOB and Hon. FICE.

References

External links
 Debrett's People of Today

1942 births
2017 deaths
Conservative Party (UK) MPs for English constituencies
Deputy Lieutenants of Leicestershire
People from Southport
UK MPs 1974
UK MPs 1974–1979
UK MPs 1979–1983
UK MPs 1983–1987
UK MPs 1987–1992
Knights Bachelor
Politicians awarded knighthoods
Conservative Party (UK) councillors
Councillors in the City of Westminster